Group B of the 2000 Fed Cup Americas Zone Group II was one of four pools in the Americas Zone Group II of the 2000 Fed Cup. Three teams competed in a round robin competition, with each team being assigned to its respective play-off region.

Ecuador vs. Bahamas

Panama vs. Antigua and Barbuda

Ecuador vs. Panama

Bahamas vs. Antigua and Barbuda

Ecuador vs. Antigua and Barbuda

Bahamas vs. Panama

See also
Fed Cup structure

References

External links
 Fed Cup website

2000 Fed Cup Americas Zone